The Autoridad Metropolitana de Autobuses (AMA, English: Puerto Rico Metropolitan Bus Authority) is a government-owned corporation and public transport bus service based in the San Juan metropolitan area. It is part of the Puerto Rico Department of Transportation and Public Works and the Puerto Rico Integrated Transit Authority (ATI).

Background 
Autoridad Metropolitana de Autobuses was created as a public corporation on May 11, 1959. The operations would later be integrated into the Department of Transportation and Public Works in 1973 and the Integrated Transit Authority in 2014. It is the second oldest public transport authority in America, behind New York's Metropolitan Transportation Authority.

AMA is one of three major public transportation systems serving the San Juan metropolitan area, along with Tren Urbano and the Cataño Ferry.

Service 

AMA provides bus transportation in the San Juan metropolitan area—which includes the municipalities of San Juan, Guaynabo, Bayamón, Trujillo Alto, Cataño, Toa Baja, Carolina, and Loíza—through a network of 32 fixed bus routes.

Most routes operate Monday through Friday from 5AM to 9PM; and Saturdays and holidays from 6:00AM to 8:00PM. Only routes E30, E40, and T3 offer Sunday service, along with Tren Urbano and the Cataño Ferry.

Most bus stops are identified with a "Parada" (English: stop) green sign.

Fares 

The regular service fare is $0.75 per ride. The only bus routes with a different fare are Routes E20 and E30 with a $2.00 cost per ride. Reduced fares are available for students, seniors, and people with disabilities.

All buses require exact change in coins or the use of a magnetic fare card available at Tren Urbano stations.

Routes 
ATI manages the operation of thirty-two bus routes in the San Juan metropolitan area; twenty-four operated by AMA and eight by First Transit. The design of the bus network includes four service categories to guide the customers and improve the coordination between buses, ferry, públicos, municipal buses, and Tren Urbano.

Transit hubs 
 Bo. Campanilla Terminal: E20, municipal buses
 Carolina Terminal: T6, T7, 44, municipal buses
 Cataño Terminal: T4, 37, municipal buses, públicos
 Hato Rey Transfer Center: TU Roosevelt, T2, T4, 1
 Iturregui Terminal: T5, T6, T41, 43, municipal buses
 Río Piedras (Capetillo) Transfer Center: T7, T9, T41, 1, 15, 26, municipal buses, públicos
 TU Bayamón Bus Terminal: E20, T2, 37, 91, 92, municipal buses, públicos, Inter American University Bayamón trolley
 TU Centro Médico Transfer Center: 17, 19
 TU Cupey Bus Terminal: E30, T7, T9, 15, 17, 18, 31, Inter American University Metro trolley
 TU Martínez Nadal Bus Terminal: T8, 19, 27, municipal buses
 TU Piñero Bus Terminal: E40, T4, T8, T41, 26
 TU Sagrado Corazón Bus Terminal: E10, T2, T3, T9, T21, 1, 15, 22, 35, 36, 45, municipal buses, públicos, Dolphy-Universidad del Sagrado Corazón
 Viejo San Juan (Covadonga) Terminal: E10, T3, T5, T9, T21, 53, municipal buses, públicos

Active bus fleet 

AMA has a total of around 100 buses in its active fleet, with the oldest active fleet model being Orion V built in 2004–2005 and 2007, and the newest being the NovaBus Smart LFS built in 2013. In addition, AMA also operates a large fleet of Orion VII NG built in 2010 and a subfleet of New Flyer DE35LF built in 2005 and 2007.

First Transit, which operates seven routes under contract, works with a fleet of Gillig Low Floors built in 2009, and NABI 42-BRT and 60-BRT for Metro Urbano (E20 route) built in 2012. The 60-BRT will be AMA's first low-floor articulated bus. This will mark only the second-time articulated buses have been used on the island; in 1984 AMA receive their first fleet of articulated buses, the MAN SG-310.

In 2015, AMA introduced the first suburban bus fleet with 33 Ford Super Duty Glaval buses.

Inactive bus fleet

See also 
Tren Urbano
Cataño Ferry
Transportation in Puerto Rico

References

External links 
 Guawa App
 First Transit Puerto Rico

Bus transportation in Puerto Rico
Puerto Rico Department of Transportation and Public Works
Government-owned corporations of Puerto Rico
Intermodal transportation authorities in Puerto Rico